was a Japanese singer, model, actress and tarento who was a member of the idol group Shiritsu Ebisu Chugaku.

Career
Matsuno was scouted into the entertainment industry in Tokyo in the Omotesandō Avenue when she was in the first grade of elementary school.  She started as an actress in 2006 in Shimokita Series and later in the same year in Yakusha Damishii. In 2007 came her big screen debut in the movie Apartment 1303. Another movie, Tōdai, followed in 2008.  In 2009–2010, she was in her agency Stardust Promotion's cheerleader themed idol group .

In February 2010, she joined the girl idol group Shiritsu Ebisu Chugaku. In May 2012, she debuted with the group on a major record label. Matsuno's Shiritsu Ebisu Chugaku "attendance number" (a number assigned to all members in the group) was nine and her "image colour" was blue.

In 2013, she starred in the horror movie  alongside fellow Shiritsu Ebisu Chugaku member Hirono Suzuki (who played the main protagonist).

Illness and death
She died on 8 February 2017 at the age of 18. Matsuno was unable to perform at her group's concert the day before due to a health issue and was taking medical treatment at home in Tokyo. In the early morning on February 8 her condition suddenly worsened. At around 5 am her parents called the emergency services. She was pronounced dead at the hospital. It is presumed that she died from an illness. In her last post on Instagram on February 6 she said that she had returned from a family trip to Hakone.

Sankei Sports reported on February 10 that according to Rina Matsuno's agency (Stardust Promotion), "lethal arrhythmia" is suspected as the cause of her death. All upcoming concerts and events were cancelled, and the group went into a period of mourning with the farewell event being held on February 25.

Musical groups
 Mini Cheer Bears (2009–2010)
 Shiritsu Ebisu Chugaku (2010–2017)

Filmography

Films

TV series 
 2014:  — a miniseries (11 episodes) starring all the members of Shiritsu Ebisu Chugaku

Advertisements

Magazines

Others

References

External links
  at Stardust Promotion 
  
 Official blog 

1998 births
2017 deaths
Shiritsu Ebisu Chugaku members
Japanese television personalities
Japanese child actresses
Japanese women pop singers
Japanese idols
Former Stardust Promotion artists
Singers from Tokyo
Actresses from Tokyo
21st-century Japanese women singers
21st-century Japanese singers
21st-century Japanese actresses